Johan Nicolai Madvig (7 August 1804 – 12 December 1886), was a Danish philologist and Kultus Minister.

Life

He was born on the Danish island of Bornholm, south of Sweden. He was educated at the classical school of Frederiksborg and the University of Copenhagen, at least partially on the cost of Marie Kofoed. In 1828 he became reader, and in 1829 professor of Latin language and literature at Copenhagen, and in 1832 was appointed university librarian. In 1848 Madvig entered parliament as a member of the "Eider-Danish" part—those who desired the Eider to be the boundary of the country. When this party came into power Madvig became Kultus Minister in the Cabinet of Moltke II and III, but left the cabinet on 7 December 1851 as a protest against the government's unity state program. In 1852 he became director of public instruction.

Some years later, from 1856 to 1863, Madvig was president of the Danish parliament and leader of the National Liberal Party. With these brief interruptions the greater part of his life was devoted to the study and teaching of Latin and the improvement of the classical schools, of which he was chief inspector. As a critic of classical texts he was distinguished for learning and acumen. He devoted much attention to Cicero, and revolutionized the study of his philosophical writings by an edition of De Finibus (1839). Other major contributions to classical scholarship are his Emendationes Livianae (1860; 2d ed. 1877) and the papers collected in his Opuscula Academica ('Minor Academic Works') (1838) and Adversaria Critica (3 vols., 1871–84). Perhaps his most widely known works are those on Latin grammar and Greek syntax, especially his Latin grammar for schools (Eng. trans. by G Woods).

In 1874 his vision began to fail, and he was forced to give up much of his work. He continued to lecture, and in 1879 he was chosen rector of the university for the sixth time. In 1880 he resigned his professorship, but went on with his work on the Roman constitution, which was completed and published before his death. In this book Madvig takes a strongly conservative standpoint and attacks Theodor Mommsen's views on Caesar's programme of reforms. It is a clear exposition, though rather too dogmatic and without sufficient regard for the views of other scholars. His last work was his autobiography, Livserindringer (published 1887).

One of his textbooks, on Latin syntax, was re-issued as recently as 2001.

References

Further reading
 Hauger, B. (1994) Johan Nicolai Madvig. The Language Theory of a Classical Philologist (Studium Sprachwissenschaft, Beiheft, 22), Nodus, Munster.
 P.J. Jensen, "Johan Nicolai Madvig," Greece & Rome 1 (1954), 129–135.
 P.J. Jensen, (1981) J. N. Madvig. Avec une esquisse de l' histoire de la philologie classique au Danemark, Odense University Presse, Odense. Traduit du Danois par Andre Nicolet.

External links
 
 

1804 births
1886 deaths
Danish Kultus Ministers
19th-century Danish philologists
University of Copenhagen alumni
Speakers of the Folketing
Rectors of the University of Copenhagen
Recipients of the Pour le Mérite (civil class)
People from Bornholm
Danish Latinists